Hearn Potato House is a historic potato house located near Laurel, Sussex County, Delaware. It one of the last surviving examples of its building type. It was built about 1900, and is a -story, gable fronted, balloon frame structure resting on a brick foundation. It retains a number of important elements characteristic of potato house including: tall, narrow proportions, triple sheathing, hatched windows, interior chimney, storage bins, ventilation features, and gable front orientation.

It was placed on the National Register of Historic Places in 1990.

References

Agricultural buildings and structures on the National Register of Historic Places in Delaware
Commercial buildings completed in 1900
Buildings and structures in Sussex County, Delaware
Potato houses in Delaware
Laurel, Delaware
National Register of Historic Places in Sussex County, Delaware